Robbiati is an Italian surname. Notable people with the surname include:

 Anselmo Robbiati (born 1970), Italian footballer and manager
 Luigi Robbiati (born 1935), Italian footballer

Italian-language surnames